The Yorkshire bagpipe is a type of bagpipe once native to the county of Yorkshire in northern England. The instrument is currently extinct, but sources as early as 1885 describe it as being familiar in Shakespeare's time.

Modern researcher Kathleen Scott notes that the instrument was often likened to sows, but not based on its sound.

References

Further reading
The Bagpipe in Northern England. R. D. Cannon. Folk Music Journal, Vol. 2, No. 2 (1971), pp. 127-147

Bagpipes
English musical instruments
Yorkshire culture